The annual South Australian National Football League (SANFL) Mark of the Year competition (currently also known as the IGA Mark of the Year) is a sporting award that celebrates each season's best mark. A mark is the action of a player cleanly catching a kicked ball that has travelled more than 15 metres (49 ft) without the ball hitting the ground.

Winners

See also 
 Spectacular mark
 Mark of the Year

References 

Australian rules football awards
Australian rules football-related lists